Arthur Larsen defeated Herbie Flam 6–3, 4–6, 5–7, 6–4, 6–3 in the final to win the men's singles tennis title at the 1950 U.S. National Championships.

Seeds
The tournament used two lists of ten players for seeding the men's singles event; one for U.S. players and one for foreign players. Arthur Larsen is the champion; others show the round in which they were eliminated.

U.S.
  J.E. Patty (first round)
  Herbie Flam (finalist)
  Gardnar Mulloy (semifinals)
  Tom Brown (quarterfinals)
  Vic Seixas (third round)
  Arthur Larsen (champion)
  Earl Cochell (quarterfinals)
  Dick Savitt (semifinals)
  Bill Talbert (quarterfinals)
  James Brink (third round)

Foreign
  Frank Sedgman (third round)
  Jaroslav Drobný (third round)
  John Bromwich (third round)
  Ken McGregor (first round)
  Torsten Johansson (third round)
  Felicisimo Ampon (third round)
  George Worthington (third round)
  Tony Mottram (second round)
  Philippe Washer (second round)
  Gustavo Palafox (first round)

Draw

Key
 Q = Qualifier
 WC = Wild card
 LL = Lucky loser
 r = Retired

Final eight

Earlier rounds

Section 1

Section 2

Section 3

Section 4

References

External links
 1950 U.S. National Championships on ITFtennis.com, the source for this draw

Men's Singles
1950